G. Srinivasan may refer to:
 G. Srinivasan (producer) (1958–2007), Indian film producer
 G. Srinivasan (actor), Indian film actor, writer and director
 G. Srinivasan (physicist) (born 1942), Indian physicist